The McGinness Hills Geothermal Complex is a complex of 3 geothermal power stations located in a valley between the Toiyabe Range and Simpson Park Range in Lander County, Nevada. It is the largest geothermal complex in Nevada and the fourth largest in the United States.

The complex consists of two 45 MW geothermal power stations that were commissioned in July 2012, as well as a third 48 MW geothermal power station that was commissioned on 20 December 2018. The entire complex is owned by Ormat.

See also
 List of geothermal power stations in the United States

References

Buildings and structures in Lander County, Nevada
Geothermal power stations in Nevada
2012 establishments in Nevada
Energy infrastructure completed in 2012